Oregon's 4th congressional district represents the southern half of Oregon's coastal counties, including Coos, Curry, Douglas, Lane, and Benton counties and most of Linn and Josephine counties. It is centered around the state's two college towns, Eugene and Corvallis, homes to the University of Oregon and Oregon State University, respectively. Politically, the district leans slightly Democratic, due to the presence of Lane County, home to almost half of the district's population, and similarly blue Benton County; Coos, Curry, Douglas, Josephine, and Linn lean Republican. The district has been represented by Democrat Val Hoyle since 2023.

List of members representing the district

Recent presidential elections

Election results
Sources (official results only): 
Elections History from the Oregon Secretary of State website
Election Statistics from the website of the  Clerk of the United States House of Representatives

1994

1996

1998

2000

2002

2004

2006

2008

2010

2012

2014

2016

2018

2020

2022

Historical district boundaries

The district gained most of Josephine County from the 2nd district in the 2002 redistricting, but also lost most of the Grants Pass area to the second district.

See also

Oregon's congressional districts
List of United States congressional districts

References
Specific

General
 
 
 Congressional Biographical Directory of the United States 1774–present	

04
Benton County, Oregon
Coos County, Oregon
Curry County, Oregon
Douglas County, Oregon
Josephine County, Oregon
Lane County, Oregon
Linn County, Oregon
1943 establishments in Oregon
Constituencies established in 1943